Michael Joseph Reynolds (9 February 1945 – 11 September 1975) was a member of the Garda Síochána, who was posthumously awarded the Scott Medal for bravery after being fatally wounded in a pursuit of bank robbers operating on behalf of the Official IRA.

Shooting at St. Anne's Park
A native of Kilconnell, Ballinasloe, Reynolds was a member of the Garda Síochána, who, following an armed robbery at the Bank of Ireland, Killester, Dublin, on the afternoon of 11 September 1975 gave chase unarmed to a robbery gang bearing firearms linked to the Official IRA, who made off with £7000 in a getaway car, narrowly avoiding a collision with Reynolds' own private car in the process.

"Believing the car to have been stolen, Reynolds went in pursuit, the chase eventually reaching speeds of sixty miles per hour through a maze of Dublin suburbs. The four raiders abandoned the car at St. Anne's Park, Raheny, and attempted to continue their flight on foot still hotly pursued by Garda Reynolds who had driven into the Park almost immediately behind them. Reynolds, who was unarmed, seized and dragged to the ground the nearest of the robbers who, burdened with their loot, were now beginning to tire. On seeing their comrade in Reynolds' hands one of the robbers called in vain for the Garda to release the man, and, when he did not do so, the robber shot Reynolds in the head."

Aftermath
Reynolds died in hospital under two hours later. Two of the raiders, initially sentenced to death, were subsequently sentenced to life imprisonment.

See also
 List of Irish police officers killed in the line of duty
 Garda ar Lár
 Yvonne Burke
 Michael Noel Canavan
 Deaths of Henry Byrne and John Morley (1980)
 Murder of Jerry McCabe (1996)
 Death of Adrian Donohoe (2013)

Sources 
An Garda Síochána and the Scott Medal, p. 175, Gerard O'Brien, Four Courts Press, 2008;

References

1945 births
1975 deaths
Deaths by firearm in the Republic of Ireland
Deaths by person in the Republic of Ireland
Garda Síochána officers killed in the line of duty
People from County Galway
People murdered in the Republic of Ireland
Date of birth missing
1975 murders in the Republic of Ireland
Recipients of the Scott Medal